In the Russet Gold of This Vain Hour is the second album by the American alternative rock band The Autumns, released in 2000.

Track listing
All songs written by The Autumns.

"Boy with the Aluminum Stilts"
"Unfolding and Fading"
"Siren Wine"
"Oriel"
"June in Her Frost & Fur"
"Mistral Chimes at Nightfall"
"Bicycle"
"The Wreathe and the Chain"
"Witch Hazel"
"In the Russet Gold of this Vain Hour"

The Autumns albums
2000 albums